The Abner Concklin House (also known as Old Yellow House) is a historic house located at Closter Road in Palisades, Rockland County, New York.

Description and history 
It was built in about 1859, and is a small, two-story frame residence, three bays wide, with later rear wings and alterations dating to about 1920. It features a hipped roof with a monitor-like cap at the apex. Also on the property are a garage and shed.

It was listed on the National Register of Historic Places on August 6, 1987.

References

Houses on the National Register of Historic Places in New York (state)
Houses completed in 1859
Houses in Rockland County, New York
National Register of Historic Places in Rockland County, New York